Charles Macheers (July 4, 1967) is a former Republican member of the Kansas House of Representatives; he represented the 39th district from 2013 to 2017

References

http://www.kslegislature.org/li/b2013_14/members/rep_macheers_charles_1/

http://www.macheers.com/

External links

Republican Party members of the Kansas House of Representatives
Living people
21st-century American politicians
1967 births
University of Kansas alumni
Western Michigan University Cooley Law School alumni